Christopher Green may refer to:

Christopher Green (art historian) (born 1943), art history professor
Christopher Green (author), Australian speculative fiction author
Christopher Green (legal scholar), professor of Constitutional Law
Christopher Green (paediatrician) (born 1948), Australian author of best-selling books on raising toddlers
Christopher Green (physician) (1652–1741), Regius Professor of Physic at Cambridge
Christopher Green (Sacramento mayor) from 1872 to 1877
Christopher Green (writer-performer) (born c. 1968), British comedian and writer
Christopher D. Green (born 1959), professor of psychology and philosophy at York University in Toronto, Canada

See also 
Chris Green (disambiguation)
Chris Greene (disambiguation)